John Lowe may refer to:

Sports
 John Lowe (darts player) (born 1945), English darts player.
 John Lowe (footballer) (1912–1995), Scottish football player
 John Lowe (rugby league), English rugby league footballer
 John Lowe (cricketer) (1888–1970), English cricketer
 John Lowe (sportswriter) (fl. 1980s–2020s), American sportswriter

Politicians
 John Lowe (MP) (1628–1667), English politician who sat in the House of Commons from 1661 to 1667
 John Lowe (Nebraska politician) (born 1959), member of the Nebraska Legislature

Entertainment
 John Muir Lowe (1898–1988), better known as John Loder
 John Lowe (musician) (born 1942), English musician

Religion
 John Lowe (martyr) (1553–1586), English Catholic priest and martyr
 John Lowe (Dean of Christ Church) (1899–1960), Canadian-born Vice-Chancellor of Oxford University

Others
 John Lowe (American Horror Story), an American Horror Story: Hotel character
 John S. Lowe (fl. 1960s–2020s), American law professor
 John Lowe (executive) (fl. 1990s–2020s), American business executive
 John Duncan Lowe (1948–1998), lawyer in Scotland
 John Lowe (indologist) (fl. 2010s–2020s), British indologist

See also
John Low (disambiguation)
Jack Lowe (disambiguation)
John Law (disambiguation)